Isca Greenfield-Sanders (born 1978) is an American landscape painter based in New York City.

Early life 
Greenfield-Sanders was born in New York City to lawyer, Karin and photographer, Timothy Greenfield-Sanders. She grew up in New York City's East Village surrounded by artists, her paternal grandmother is concert pianist and teacher Ruth W. Greenfield, her maternal grandmother is Leider singer, Isca Sanders, her maternal grandfather is painter Joop Sanders, her sister is filmmaker, Liliana Greenfield-Sanders.

In 2000 she received a B.A. in math and a B.A. with honors in visual arts from Brown University. She was a visiting artist at the American Academy in Rome in 2001. In 2003 she married artist Sebastian Blanck, with family friend Lou Reed officiating the wedding.

Career 
Greenfield-Sanders is  known for her mixed media oil paintings and watercolors based on found photography.  Her work is in the public collections of the Solomon R. Guggenheim Museum in New York City, The Brooklyn Museum in Brooklyn, NY, The Museum of Fine Arts, Houston, The Museum Morsbroich in Leverkusen Germany and the Victoria and Albert Museum in London.

Her print work with Paulson Fontaine Press started in 2006 and includes over 20 etchings.

In 2003 she created a project room at MOMA PS1.  In 2005 Creative Time commissioned her to make a large scale billboard in Coney Island as a part of the Dreamland Artists Club. In 2016 Greenfield-Sanders partnered with the Children's Museum of the Arts to create four large outdoor murals for the New York City Parks Department for a playground in downtown New York City.

References

1978 births
Living people
Brown University alumni
American women painters
Painters from New York (state)
21st-century American painters
21st-century American women artists
20th-century American women artists